Luis Filipe de Bragança e Sousa da Silva Teixeira (born November 3, 1959 in Luanda) is a Portuguese essayist and university teacher.

He has a PhD in Portuguese Studies and 19th Century Portuguese culture from the Universidade Nova de Lisboa (1998). He has a master in Philosophy from Lisbon University. As of February 2012 he is a tenured Professor in the School of Communication Sciences, Arts and Information Technologies (Member of the Executive Board) at the Universidade Lusófona de Humanidades e Tecnologias, in Lisbon. He has also worked as a researcher at CIES-IUL (ISCTE-IUL) and at NELI-Nucleo de Estudos em LIteratura e Intersemiose (Univ. Federal de Pernambuco - Brasil). He 2004 he published the book, Hermes ou a Experiência da Mediação (Hermes or the Mediation Experience)  with a full section dedicated to ludology.

References

External links 
Luis Filipe Teixeira website

1959 births
Portuguese philosophers
Portuguese essayists
Portuguese male writers
Living people
Male essayists